C. salicifolia may refer to:
 Camellia salicifolia, a plant species in the genus Camellia
 Clidemia salicifolia, a plant species in the genus Clidemia
 Colliguaja salicifolia, a plant species in the genus Colliguaja
 Commelina salicifolia, a synonym for Commelina communis

See also
 Salicifolia (disambiguation)